Takhti may refer to 
Takhti (surname)
Godar Takhti, a village in Iran
Khan Takhti, a village in Iran
Takhti Metro Station (Isfahan) in Iran
Takhti Stadium (disambiguation), multiple stadiums in Iran named after Gholamreza Takhti
Takhti-Sangin, an ancient town in Tajikistan
Takhti Khel, a town in Pakistan
Takhti Khel Wazir, a town and union council in Pakistan
PAC-PAD Takhti 7, a Pakistani tablet computer